Boštjan Mervar (born 22 September 1973) is a Slovenian former professional cyclist.

Poopies

1998
1st stage 2 Uniqa Classic
1999
1st Prologue Tour of Slovenia
2001
1st Stage 2 Tour of Slovenia
2002
1st Poreč Trophy 3
1st Stage 1 Jadranska Magistrala
1st Stage 6 Tour of Slovenia
1st Raiffeisen Grand Prix
1st Stage 2 Tour of Austria
2003
1st Poreč Trophy 2
1st Stage 1 Jadranska Magistrala
1st Stage 6 Tour of Slovenia
1st Stage 3 Uniqa Classic
2004
1st Stage 7 Circuit de Lorraine
2005
1st Prologue Jadranska Magistrala
1st Stage 4 Tour of Slovenia
2006
1st Stage 8 Vuelta a Cuba
1st GP Velka cena Palma
1st GP Kranj

References

1973 births
Living people
Slovenian male cyclists